Balsamocarpon brevifolium, or algarrobilla, is a species of flowering plants in the legume family, Fabaceae. It belongs to the subfamily Caesalpinioideae and is found in Chile (Atacama, Coquimbo).

References

Caesalpinieae
Fabaceae genera
Monotypic Fabaceae genera